Forbidden Games is a 1952 French war drama film directed by René Clément and based on François Boyer's novel Jeux Interdits.
 
While not initially successful in France, the film was a hit elsewhere. It won the Golden Lion at the Venice Film Festival, a Special Award as Best Foreign Language Film in the United States, and a Best Film from any Source at the British Academy Film Awards.

Plot
It is June 1940, during the Battle of France.  After five-year-old Paulette's parents and pet dog die in a German air attack on a column of refugees fleeing Paris, the traumatized child meets 10-year-old Michel Dollé whose peasant family takes her in. She quickly becomes attached to Michel. The two attempt to cope with the death and destruction that surrounds them by secretly building a small cemetery among the ruins of an abandoned watermill, where they bury her dog and start to bury other animals, marking their graves with crosses stolen from a local graveyard, including one belonging to Michel's brother. Michel's father first suspects that Michel's brother's cross was stolen from the graveyard by his neighbour. Eventually, the father finds out that Michel has stolen the cross.

Meanwhile, the French gendarmes come to the Dollé household in order to take Paulette. Michel cannot bear the thought of her leaving and tells his father that he would tell him where the stolen crosses are, but in return he should not give Paulette to the gendarmes. When his father doesn't keep his promise, Michel destroys the crosses by throwing them into the stream. Paulette ends up going to a Red Cross camp, but at the end of the film is seen running away into a crowd of people in the camp, crying for Michel and then for her mother.

Cast
 Georges Poujouly as Michel Dollé
 Brigitte Fossey as Paulette
 Amédée as Francis Gouard
 Laurence Badie as Berthe Dollé
 Suzanne Courtal as Madame Dollé
 Lucien Hubert as Dollé
 Jacques Marin as Georges Dollé
 Pierre Merovée as Raymond Dollé
 Louis Saintève as the Priest

Reception
The film was widely praised among critics, whose "howling protests" were heard at the 1952 Cannes Film Festival where it was not an "official entry of France"; instead, it was "screened on the fringe of the Competition."

The film was entered into competition at the 13th Venice International Film Festival; festival organizers at first considered the film ineligible because it had been screened at Cannes;  it ended up receiving the Golden Lion, the Festival's highest prize.

Upon its release, it was lambasted by some, who said it was a "vicious and unfair picture of the peasantry of France"; in France, 4,910,835 theater tickets were sold, making the most successful film at the French box office in 1952. Following its December 1952 release in the United States, Bosley Crowther called it a film with "the irony of a Grand Illusion, the authenticity of a Harvest and the finesse of French films at their best";  according to Crowther, the film is a "brilliant and devastating drama of the tragic frailties of men, clear and uncorrupted by sentimentality or dogmatism in its candid view of life."
 
At the 25th Academy Awards, Forbidden Games won an out-of-competition Special Award as Best Foreign Language Film.
In December 1952, at the 24th National Board of Review Awards it was chosen as one of that year's five top foreign films.  At the 1952 New York Film Critics Circle Awards, it won for Best Foreign Language Film.

In 1954, it was BAFTA's Best Film from any Source; in 1955, at the 27th Academy Awards, François Boyer was nominated for an Academy Award for Best Story; Philip Yordan won, for his work on Broken Lance.

Decades after its release, David Ehrenstein called it "deeply touching" and wrote: "Fossey's is quite simply one of the most uncanny pieces of acting ever attempted by a youngster.  Clément’s sensitivity doubtless accounts for much of what we see here, but the rest is clearly Fossey’s own."

Roger Ebert added the film to his Great Movies collection in 2005, writing: "Movies like Clement's "Forbidden Games" cannot work unless they are allowed to be completely simple, without guile, transparent. Despite the scenes I have described, it is never a tear-jerker. It doesn't try to create emotions, but to observe them."

Soundtrack
The main theme of the soundtrack is a guitar arrangement of the melody "Romance".

Home media
Forbidden Games was released on Laserdisc in 1988 by Criterion Collection (under license of Turner and MGM/UA Home Video), who later also released it on DVD in 2004 by license of Warner Bros. and Turner Entertainment Co.

References

External links
 
 
 
Forbidden Games: Death and the Maiden an essay by Peter Matthews at the Criterion Collection

1950s French-language films
1950s war drama films
1952 drama films
1952 films
Best Film BAFTA Award winners
Best Foreign Language Film Academy Award winners
Films about orphans
Films about the Battle of France
Films about funerals
Films awarded an Academy Honorary Award
Films based on French novels
Films directed by René Clément
Films set in 1940
Films set in cemeteries
Films set in France
Films shot in France
Films with screenplays by Jean Aurenche
Films with screenplays by Pierre Bost
French black-and-white films
French war drama films
French World War II films
Golden Lion winners
1950s French films